This article details the squads that were used for the 2020 edition of The Basketball Tournament.

Seeds 1–8
These teams received first-round byes, and played their first games in the Round of 16.

No. 1 Carmen's Crew

No. 2 Overseas Elite

Source:

No. 3 Boeheim's Army

No. 4 Golden Eagles

No. 5 Eberlein Drive

No. 6 Team Challenge ALS

No. 7 The Money Team

No. 8 Red Scare

Seeds 9–16
These teams were the higher seeds in their round of 24 matches.

No. 9 Big X

No. 10 Peoria All-Stars

No. 11 Team Hines

No. 12 Brotherly Love

No. 13 Team CP3

No. 14 HEARTFIRE

No. 15 Armored Athlete

No. 16 House of 'Paign

Seeds 17–24
These teams were the lower seeds in their Round of 24 matchups.

No. 17 War Tampa

No. 18 Power of the Paw

No. 19 Men of Mackey

No. 20 PrimeTime Players

No. 21 Stillwater Stars

No. 22 Sideline Cancer

No. 23 Herd That

No. 24 D2

References

External links
 Teams at thetournament.com

The Basketball Tournament